NHL 2K11 is an ice hockey sports video game developed by Visual Concepts and published by 2K Sports.

The game was announced on March 3, 2010, as a Wii-exclusive game. It was the first game in the NHL 2K series since NHL 2K7 not to be released on the PlayStation 3, the first since NHL 2K6 not to be released on the Xbox 360, the first since NHL 2K3 to not be released on the PlayStation 2, and the last game in the NHL 2K series to be released on the Wii, as the next entry in the series is released only on iOS and Android devices. Take-Two chairman Strauss Zelnick said that "As far as NHL, we're taking a year off on PS3 and Xbox 360 to refine, redesign and re-think". This was the last game for the NHL 2K series on consoles.

Then Vancouver Canucks forward Ryan Kesler is the cover athlete for NHL 2K11.

Features
The game introduced an all-new "Road to the Cup" mode, featuring Miis. The mode also includes mini-games, trivia challenges and skills competitions. NHL 2K11 also included things like broken sticks, more responsive skating, improved artificial intelligence and enhanced graphics. The Winter Classic was also added as a mode as well as create a player, you can make any kind of player you want and you can make them a 99 overall in this game.

Reception

The iPhone version received "generally favorable reviews", while the Wii version received "mixed" reviews, according to the review aggregation website Metacritic.

See also
NHL 11, another ice hockey video game, developed by EA Sports, released on the PlayStation 3 and Xbox 360
NHL Slapshot, another ice hockey video game developed by EA Sports, also for the Wii console

References

External links
2K Sports Official website

2010 video games
2K Sports games
11
Ice hockey video games
IOS games
Nintendo Wi-Fi Connection games
Video games developed in China
Video games developed in the United States
Cancelled Xbox 360 games
Cancelled PlayStation 3 games
Wii MotionPlus games
Wii Speak games
Wii Wi-Fi games
Video games set in 2010
Video games set in 2011
Multiplayer and single-player video games
Take-Two Interactive games